Andrew "Andy" Sydney Withiel Thomas, AO (born 18 December 1951) is an Australian and American aerospace engineer and a former NASA astronaut. He has dual nationality; he became a U.S. citizen in December 1986, hoping to gain entry to NASA's astronaut program. He is married to fellow NASA astronaut Shannon Walker.

Education
Thomas went to St Andrews Primary School, Adelaide at Walkerville in South Australia and subsequently to St Peter's College, Adelaide. After secondary school, he studied at the University of Adelaide, where he received a BEng degree with First Class Honours in 1973 and a PhD degree in 1978, both in Mechanical Engineering.

He appears in the 1972 edition of the Adelaide University Engineering Society's (AUES) annual publication, Hysteresis. The caption below a photograph of the 21-year-old Thomas reads:

He is the great-great-grandson of Frederick George Waterhouse, first curator of the South Australian Institute Museum, and naturalist of the John McDouall Stuart Expedition 1861–1862.

Early career
As a child, growing up in Fullarton, Adelaide, Thomas was fascinated by space. His father has described how he started building model rockets from cardboard and plastics. After completing his studies, Thomas accepted an offer from Lockheed in Atlanta.  By 1990 he was the organisation's principal aerodynamic scientist. His career continued in the field, steering towards more senior research positions.

NASA career
Thomas was selected by NASA in March 1992 and reported to the Johnson Space Center in August 1992. In August 1993, following one year of training, he was appointed a member of the NASA Astronaut Corps and was qualified for an assignment as a mission specialist on Space Shuttle flight crews.

While awaiting space flight assignment, Thomas supported shuttle launch and landing operations as an Astronaut Support Person (ASP) at the Kennedy Space Center. He also provided technical support to the Space Shuttle Main Engine project, the Solid Rocket Motor project and the External Tank project at the Marshall Space Flight Center. In June 1995, Thomas was named as payload commander for STS-77 and flew his first flight in space on Endeavour in May 1996.  Although Paul D. Scully-Power had entered orbit as an oceanographer in 1985, Thomas was the first Australia-born professional astronaut to enter space.

He next trained at the Gagarin Cosmonaut Training Center in Star City, Russia in preparation for a long-duration flight. In 1998, he served as Board Engineer 2 aboard the Russian Space Station Mir for 140 days. From August 2001 to November 2003, Thomas served as Deputy Chief of the Astronaut Office. Thomas completed his fourth space flight on STS-114 and has logged over 177 days in space. He was working with issues for the Exploration Branch of the Astronaut Office until his retirement from NASA in February 2014.

NASA officially announced Thomas' retirement on 20 June 2014, which took effect on 1 March 2014, after 22 years with the space agency.

Spaceflights
STS-77 was a mission during which the crew deployed two satellites, tested a large inflatable space structure on orbit and conducted a variety of scientific experiments in a Spacehab laboratory module carried in Endeavour's payload bay.

On 22 January 1998, Thomas launched aboard Space Shuttle  Endeavour as part of the STS-89 crew to dock with the Mir Space Station. He served aboard Mir as flight engineer 2 and returned to earth with the crew of STS-91 aboard Space Shuttle  Discovery on 12 June 1998, completing 130 days in space and 2,250 orbits of the earth. 

STS-102 Discovery (8–21 March 2001) was the eighth Shuttle mission to visit the International Space Station and Thomas's third flight. Mission accomplishments included the delivery of the Expedition 2 crew and logistics resupply with the Leonardo Multi-Purpose Logistics Module, and then return to earth of the Expedition 1 crew. During the mission, Thomas performed an EVA of 6.5 hours to install components to the outside of the space station. Mission duration was 307 hours and 49 minutes.

STS-114 Discovery (26 July – 9 August 2005) was the Return to Flight mission following the  Columbia accident during which the crew continued the assembly of the International Space Station. Thomas tested and evaluated new procedures for flight safety and inspection and repair techniques for the Shuttle's thermal protection system. After a 2-week, 5.8 million mile journey in space, the orbiter Discovery and its crew returned to land at Edwards Air Force Base, California. Mission duration was 333 hours, 32 minutes, 48 seconds.

Post-NASA career 
On the 20th of November 2020 the Andy Thomas Foundation was launched. The purpose was to advance space education, raise space awareness, and contribute to the national space community.

Honours and awards
 2000: Appointed Officer of the Order of Australia (AO) "for service to science and technology through the National Aeronautics and Space Administration (NASA) programme as an astronaut and for contributions to the human exploration of space."
 2001: Centenary Medal
2018: Life Membership of the Space Industry Association of Australia

See also
Philip K. Chapman

References

Further reading
 Colin Burgess. Australia's Astronauts: Three Men and a Spaceflight Dream, Kangaroo Press, 1999.

External links

NASA Astronaut Bio: Andrew S. W. Thomas (Ph.D.)(March 2014)
Astronaut blasts lack of research into space (The Sun-Herald, 20 May 2004): Comments from Thomas about state of Australian space science
 Ri Aus - people in Science
 National Museum of Australia: A fragment of wooden propeller from the Southern Cross, flown by Charles Kingsford Smith in the 1920s and 30s, which was taken into space by Andy Thomas in 2001 to honour Kingsford Smith's aviation achievements.

1951 births
Living people
Australian astronauts
Australian emigrants to the United States
People from Adelaide
University of Adelaide alumni
People educated at St Peter's College, Adelaide
NASA civilian astronauts
People with acquired American citizenship
Officers of the Order of Australia
Recipients of the Centenary Medal
Lockheed people
Crew members of the International Space Station
Space Shuttle program astronauts
Spacewalkers
Mir crew members